Tim Owen KC, is an English barrister at Matrix Chambers.  His practice spans the fields of fraud/regulatory, criminal, public, human rights, media and information, extradition/MLA, sports, asset recovery, police and civil law.

In addition to his practice at the Bar, he sits as a Deputy High Court Judge in the Administrative Court, is an Acting Judge to the Grand Court of the Cayman Islands and a Member of the Sports Resolutions Panel of Arbitrators and Mediators.  He is a founder member of Matrix Chambers and a Master of the Bench of Middle Temple.

Education and career
Educated at United World College of the Atlantic and London School of Economics, Tim Owen was called to the Bar in 1983. He was appointed QC in 2000. He is currently a member of Matrix Chambers.

Cases

Rurik Jutting 
In 2016, Tim Owen defended Rurik Jutting, a British banker who confessed to torturing and killing two Indonesian women in HK, arguing diminished responsibility. The trial evidence included videos of torture Jutting recorded on his phone. They were deemed so traumatising that journalists and the public were prevented from seeing them. Jutting was convicted of murder and sentenced to life in prison.

Jimmy Lai 
In late 2022, Jimmy Lai's request to use Owen on his defense team was appealed by Paul Lam and the Department of Justice multiple times. On 30 December 2022, the  NPCSC gave the Chief Executive of Hong Kong the power to bar foreign lawyers from cases related to national security.

Personal life
Tim Owen was married to actress Jemma Redgrave, a member of the Redgrave family, between 1992 and 2020. They have two sons, Gabriel, born in 1994, and Alfie, born in 2000.

He married Singapore-based Hong Kong journalist Wei Du in 2020.

Publications
Prison Law, 5th edition (OUP, 2015)
Asset Recovery: Criminal Confiscation and Civil Recovery (OUP, 2021) co-editor
Blackstone's Criminal Practice 2021 (Advisory editor)
Halsbury's Laws, vol 36(2), Prisons and Prisoners (Butterworths, 1999)
Criminal Proceedings, Police Powers and the Human Rights Act 1998 (OUP, 2000) contributing author

References

External links
 Tim Owen QC Matrix Chambers Profile (Matrix Chambers)

English King's Counsel
People educated at Atlantic College
People educated at a United World College
Alumni of the London School of Economics
Living people
Year of birth missing (living people)